Tanakaea radicans, the Japanese foam flower, is a member of the Saxifrage family native to Japan, and is the sole species in the genus Tanakaea. It is named after the Japanese botanist Tanaka Yoshio. It was initially described by Ludovic Savatier and Adrien René Franchet.

Tanakaea radicans propagates via rhizomes similar to the runners of a strawberry. Its preferred habitat in the wild is shady, damp rocky soil.

References

Saxifragaceae
Monotypic Saxifragales genera
Saxifragaceae genera